Faisal Raza Khan is an Indian television actor, director, photographer. He is better known for his roles in Ssshhhh...Phir Koi Hai Season 3, Do Saheliyaan, Sapno Ke Bhanwar Mein and Gustakh Dil.

Television
Star One's Ssshhhh...Phir Koi Hai Season 3
Zee TV's Do Saheliyaan
Life OK's Sapno Ke Bhanwar Mein and Gustakh Dil
Zee TV's Banoo main teri Dulhan

References

Living people
Indian male television actors
Male actors in Hindi television
Male actors from Mumbai
21st-century Indian male actors
Year of birth missing (living people)